Statistics of Belgian League in season 1984–85.

Overview

It was performed by 18 teams, and R.S.C. Anderlecht won the championship, while K. Sint-Niklase S.K.E. and Racing Jet de Bruxelles were relegated.

League standings

Results

Topscorers

References

Belgian Pro League seasons
Belgian
1